Vale of Leithen Football Club is a football club based in the town of Innerleithen, Scotland. They play in the East of Scotland Premier League and their home games take place at Victoria Park.

The team's motto is "Keep Faith", and features on their club crest, along with the town's patron saint, St. Ronan. The home strip features a blue shirt with white sleeves, blue shorts and red socks; the away strip is all-red, with white trim on the sleeves.

Vale of Leithen should not be confused with the slightly differently named West of Scotland team Vale of Leven.

History 
The club is one of the oldest in the Scottish Borders, having formed in 1891, they became full members of the Scottish Football Association in 1897. The club played at Caddon Park and initially played their first two games as Leithen Vale but subsequently changed their name to Vale of Leithen Football Club. In 1922, they moved to their current home, Victoria Park.

The club were founding members of the Lowland Football League in 2013–14, having previously played in the East of Scotland Football League. Their best finishing position was 6th place in their first campaign, spending nine seasons in the league before being relegated back to the East of Scotland League at the end of the 2021–22 season.

Current squad

Coaching staff

Season-by-season record

† Season curtailed due to coronavirus pandemic.

Honours
East of Scotland Football League

 Winners (4): 1924–25, 1977–78, 1978–79, 1986–87

East of Scotland Qualifying Cup
Winners (6) : 1919–20, 1920–21, 1924–25, 1948–49, 1985–86, 1978–79, 1981–82
Scottish Qualifying Cup (South)

 Winners (5): 1957–58, 1972–73, 1976–77, 1990–91, 1992–93

East of Scotland (City Cup)

 Winners (1): 1991–92

King Cup
Winners (7) : 1921–22, 1936–37, 1955–56, 1959–60, 1985–86, 1986–87, 1991–92

References

External links
 Official club site

 
Football clubs in Scotland
Association football clubs established in 1891
1891 establishments in Scotland
East of Scotland Football League teams
Lowland Football League teams
Innerleithen
Football clubs in the Scottish Borders